Peter Blair Fleming (born January 21, 1955 in Chatham Borough, New Jersey) is an American former professional tennis player. In his doubles partnership with John McEnroe, he won 52 titles, of which seven were at Grand Slams (four at Wimbledon, three at the US Open). As a singles player, he peaked at world No. 8, winning three titles (including the 1979 Cincinnati Open).

Tennis career
Fleming attended Chatham High School, where he won the New Jersey high school individual championship in 1972, during his junior year. He won the men's singles in the Ojai Tennis Tournament in 1975.

During the 1980s, Fleming teamed up with fellow American John McEnroe to dominate the men's doubles game. The duo won 52 doubles titles together, including four at Wimbledon (1979, 1981, 1983 and 1984), and three at the US Open (1979, 1981 and 1983). Fleming once said that "The best doubles pair in the world is John McEnroe and anyone".

Fleming also played on three American Davis Cup winning teams (1979, 1981 and 1982), and helped the US win the World Team Cup twice (1984 and 1985).  Fleming reached the World No. 1 doubles ranking in 1984. His career-high singles ranking was world No. 8 in 1980, the year in which he reached the quarter-finals at the Wimbledon championships. Over the course of his career Fleming won three top-level singles titles and sixty doubles titles.  Prior to turning professional, Fleming played tennis for the University of California, Los Angeles (after transferring from the University of Michigan), and won the National Collegiate Athletic Association doubles title in 1976.

Since retiring as a player, Fleming has become a tennis commentator for Sky Sports, Eurosport  and the BBC.

Fleming is a keen golfer (handicap 10) and is an active member of The Stage Golf Society.

He was inducted into the Intercollegiate Tennis Association (ITA) Hall of Fame. On July 30, 2011, Fleming, the Farmers Classic 1979 singles and 1983 doubles champion, was named 2011 Farmers Classic Tournament Honoree.

In 2020 five of Fleming's Wimbledon Lawn Tennis Championships Medals, dating from 1978 to 2002, were found in London and reported to the Portable Antiquities Scheme.

WCT, Grand Prix, and Grand Slam finals

Doubles (60 wins, 21 losses)

Singles (3 wins, 5 losses)

ATP doubles records

Notes

References

External links

 
 
 
 Top male tennis players from New Jersey

American color commentators
American male tennis players
Chatham High School (New Jersey) alumni
People from Chatham Borough, New Jersey
Sportspeople from Glen Cove, New York
Sportspeople from Morris County, New Jersey
Tennis commentators
Tennis people from New Jersey
Tennis people from New York (state)
UCLA Bruins men's tennis players
US Open (tennis) champions
Wimbledon champions
1955 births
Living people
Grand Slam (tennis) champions in men's doubles
Michigan Wolverines men's tennis players
ATP number 1 ranked doubles tennis players